Boghé (also Bogué) is a town and commune in the Brakna Region of southern Mauritania, located on the border with Senegal.

In 2013, it had a census population of 40,341.

The city has a high school but no university. Efforts are under way to build a hospital to serve the city and its region.

Climate
In Boghé, the climate is warm and temperate. There is little rainfall. The Köppen-Geiger climate classification is BSh. About  of precipitation falls annually.

References

Communes of Brakna Region